Etienne Ndayiragije (born 3 December 1978) is a Burundian football manager who manages the Burundi national team.

On 12 February 2021, The Tanzania Football Federation (TFF) has parted company with the national football team head coach Etienne Ndayiragije by mutual consent.

On 25 January 2023, Etienne was appointed by The Football Federation of Burundi (FFB) as the new coach for the Burundi national football team.

References 

Year of birth missing (living people)
Living people
Tanzanian football managers
Tanzania national football team managers